Han Song may refer to:

Han Song (Han Dynasty) (born 154), advisor during the late Eastern Han Dynasty
Han Song (academic) (born 1947), South Korean academic
Han Song (writer) (born 1965), Chinese science fiction writer